Jibacoa is a Cuban village and consejo popular ("people's council", i.e. hamlet) of the municipality of Manicaragua, in Villa Clara Province. As of 2004, it had a population of 3,101; and the council's administrative territory covers an area of 78.5 km².

History
The village was founded in 1961, soon after the Cuban Revolution. Its toponyms, as well as other included in the municipality (as Manicaragua, Mataguá, etc.) have an Arawak origin.

Geography

Overview
Jibacoa is a hilltown surrounded by the Escambray Mountains, located near the southeastern shore of the Hanabanilla Lake and the Jibacoa Dam (Presa Jibacoa), and 39 km from the resort village of El Salto del Hanabanilla. The Jibacoa River flows to the east of the settlement and, next to it, is located a karst cave named Cueva del Guanajo.

It lies near the border point of Villa Clara Province with the ones of Cienfuegos and Sancti Spíritus, and is crossed by the provincial highway 152, linking Manicaragua (17 km north) to Trinidad (44 km south), through the nature reserve of Topes de Collantes. A secondary mountain road, 10 km long, links it to the village of Güinía de Miranda.

The village is 46 km far from Cumanayagua, 74 from Cienfuegos and 76 from Santa Clara.

Subdivision
The consejo popular of Jibacoa is divided in 11 areas: Jibacoa plus 10 minor villages and localities.

Culture
In the village are held different events throughout the year: the Festival del Cine de la Montaña ("Mountain's Film Festival") from 1995, the Festival del Libro de la Montaña ("Mountain's Book Festival"), and the Carnavales de Junio ("June Carnivals").

See also
Hanabanilla Dam
Municipalities of Cuba
List of cities in Cuba

References

External links

Jibacoa weather forecast
 "The television arrived in Jibacoa" (Juventud Rebelde)

Populated places in Villa Clara Province
Populated places established in 1961
1961 establishments in North America